Olivier Gaillard (born 28 February 1967) is a French politician representing La République En Marche! (LREM). He was a member of the French National Assembly from 18 June 2017 to 26 June 2021, representing the 5th constituency of the department of Gard.

Having previously been an active member of the Socialist Party, Gaillard joined LREM in 2017.

In parliament, Gaillard serves on the Finance Committee. In addition to his committee assignments, he is a member of the French-Ecuardorian Parliamentary Friendship Group.

In July 2019, Gaillard was one of nine LREM members who voted against his parliamentary group's majority and opposed the French ratification of the European Union’s Comprehensive Economic and Trade Agreement (CETA) with Canada. He left LREM in 2020.

See also
 2017 French legislative election

References

Living people
Deputies of the 15th National Assembly of the French Fifth Republic
La République En Marche! politicians
Place of birth missing (living people)
1967 births